Prof. Dr. Anak Agung Gde Agung is the eldest son of Ide Anak Agung Gde Agung, the Raja of Gianyar (Bali),  a founding father of modern Indonesia.

Anak Agung received his Bachelor of Arts (Honors) in government studies from Harvard University and then his Master of Arts degree from the Fletcher School of International Law and Diplomacy, Tufts University in Massachusetts, USA. Thereafter he received his doctoral degree (PhD) in social sciences from Leiden University in the Netherlands.

Career
Anak Agung started his professional career in business in Indonesia in domestic and multinational corporations as President / CEO, Chief Commissioner and Owner. In 1999 he entered politics and became a Senator in the Supreme Consultative Assembly of the Republic of Indonesia (MPR - RI). This was followed by his appointment by President Abdurrahman Wahid as Minister of Societal and Community Affairs and as Head of the National Social Welfare Agency of the Republic of Indonesia. After leaving government service, Anak Agung went on to teaching and received his Professorship from the Indonesian government in the field of culture and tourism on which he has written several books.

Other activities
Anak Agung has also been: Chairman of the Board of Trustees of the Indonesia Financial Executive Association (IFEA), chairman of the Board of Trustees of the Indonesia Heritage Society, chairman of the Board of Trustees of the Sekar Manggis Foundation, Trustee of the Trisakti University Foundation and of the PPM (Management Education and Development) Foundation, Member of the Board of Advisors of the United States - Indonesia Society (USINDO).

Books published

References

Citations 

Balinese people
The Fletcher School at Tufts University alumni
Harvard College alumni
Year of birth missing (living people)
Living people